This is a list of the heads of state of Jamaica, from the independence of Jamaica in 1962 to the present day.

From 1962 the head of state under the Jamaica Independence Act 1962 is the Monarch of Jamaica, currently Charles III, who is also the King of the United Kingdom and the other Commonwealth realms. The King is represented in Jamaica by a Governor-General.

Monarch (1962–present)
The succession to the throne is the same as the succession to the British throne.

Governor-General
The Governor-General is the representative of the monarch in Jamaica and exercises most of their powers. The Governor-General is appointed for an indefinite term, serving at the pleasure of the monarch. After the passage of the Statute of Westminster 1931, the Governor-General is appointed solely on the advice of the Cabinet of Jamaica without the involvement of the British government. In the event of a vacancy the Chief Justice served as Officer Administering the Government.

Status

Standards

References

External links
 World Statesmen – Jamaica
 Rulers.org – Jamaica

Government of Jamaica
Heads of state
Jamaica